Anthony Spencer "Tony" Irving (born 5 July 1966), is a British-Swedish TV-personality, radiopresenter and entertainer, best known as the jury chairman from TV4's (Swedish television channel) dance program Let's Dance.

Life and career
Irving grew up in Ainsworth and is a professional dancer, choreographer and entertainer, who became famous in Sweden in 2006 when starring as a judge on the popular TV-show Let's Dance. Besides Let's Dance, Tony has written several books, starred in other Swedish TV-programs and performs on stage.

Tony hosts the radioshow "Äntligen Lördag" (Finally Saturday), at Mix Megapol, every Saturday from 11am to 3pm. He is the character Mr Red in the cabaret show "Wild Thing" at Metropol Palais in Stockholm and also performs regularly on the cruise ship Viking Line (Cinderella). He has written the books "Move your ass", "Tony Irving 10" and most recently his autobiography "Life, Love and Passion", co-written with Linda Newhamn.

In 2016, Tony's new TV-show "Camping Queens" premiers with co-star Jonas Hallberg on channel 7.

As an entrepreneur, Irving has during his 33-year career, run dance schools in America, England and Sweden. He has established and now operates the Tony Irving Dance Academy in Stockholm, Sweden.

Irving moved to Sweden in 1993, becoming a judge in the Swedish Ballroom Dancing Championship. Irving has represented the United States, England and Sweden as a professional international sports dancer. He has been a finalist in several international competitions. In 2001 and 2002, he was the Swedish champion in professional dance. Irving holds all international judging licences' and has judged many world ranking competitions. He is also one of the few international adjudicators to have judged four world championships.

Personal life 
Tony Irving lives together with husband Alexander Skiöldsparr in Norrtälje with their dogs.

External links 

 

1966 births
Swedish television personalities
British ballroom dancers
Living people
Dance teachers
British male dancers
People from Radcliffe, Greater Manchester
British emigrants to Sweden
British LGBT broadcasters
English LGBT entertainers
Swedish LGBT entertainers